Hylophorbus is a genus of microhylid frogs endemic to New Guinea. Common name Mawatta frogs has been coined for them.

Molecular data suggest that Hylophorbus is monophyletic and that its sister taxon is Callulops.

Species
There are 12 recognized species:

References

External links
  taxon Hylophorbus at http://www.eol.org.

 
Microhylidae
Amphibian genera
Amphibians of New Guinea
Taxa named by William John Macleay
Endemic fauna of New Guinea